"Boh predvichnyi narodyvsia" is a Ukrainian Christmas carol, which is translated into English as "Eternal God Born Tonight" or sometimes "Pre-eternal God Was Born." It focuses on the incarnation in the story of the nativity.

Background
One of the most famous carols in Western Ukraine and the amongst the Ukrainian diaspora, it is customary to sing this carol before the traditional Twelve-dish Christmas Eve supper is served in many parts of the historic region of Galicia. It also sung in churches at the end of the Divine Liturgy from Christmas Day until Candlemas.

"Boh predvichnyi narodylsia" is in the "Bohohlasnyk" - a Ukrainian anthology of pious songs, which was published in Pochayiv Monastery during the late eighteenth century. The poet Ivan Franko considered this the best of all Ukrainian church songs, calling it "a pearl among carols."

Lyrics
There are multiple versions of this carol, ranging in length from 2 to 10 verses. This version includes 7 verses, and reflects the most common form used in the United States liturgically.

Analyzing the text of carol, Mikhailo Voznyak points out that line about the wise men returning by a different route is probably a later insertion; it is not in the original text, which has been preserved from the eighteenth century. He also attributes its popularity with the peasant culture of eighteenth and nineteenth century Ukraine to its egalitarian message conveyed by the placing of shepherds before the kings and conveying the message that the even the poorest and most wretched, like Jesus himself, find equality or even glory in the Christmas story.

See also
 List of Christmas carols

References

Koliadka
Christmas carols
Ukrainian folk songs
Year of song unknown
Songwriter unknown